The 2019 Trampoline Gymnastics World Championships was held in Tokyo, Japan from November 28 to December 1, 2019. The competition took place at the Ariake Gymnastics Centre, the same venue that would also host the gymnastics competitions at the Tokyo 2020 Summer Olympics, and served as a test event and a qualifier for the 2020 Summer Olympics.

37 federations had registered for the event.

Participating nations

  (1)
  (11)
  (23)
  (3)
  (3)
  (9)
  (5)
  (8)
  (2)
  (20)
  (22)
  (2)
  (9)
  (8)
  (14)
  (2)
  (7) 
  (22)
  (4)
  (1)
  (4)
  (19)
  (4)
  (10)
  (7)
  (11)
  (4)
  (17)
  (26)
  (11)
  (4)
  (2)
  (3)
  (14)
  (25)
  (3)
  (1)

Medal summary

Medal table

References

External links
Official website
FIG Event Page

Trampoline Gymnastics World Championships
Trampoline World Championships
Trampoline World Championships
Trampoline Championships
Sports competitions in Tokyo
Gymnastics in Japan
Trampoline World Championships
Trampoline World Championships
Trampoline